Janet Kim Albrechtsen (born 23 September 1966) is an Australian opinion columnist with The Australian. From 2005 until 2010, she was a member of the board of the Australian Broadcasting Corporation, Australia's public broadcaster.

Early life and education
The daughter of Danish immigrants to Australia, Albrechtsen was born in Adelaide and attended Seacombe High School. She subsequently studied at University of Adelaide, graduating with a Bachelor of Laws with Honours. She subsequently attained a Doctor of Juridical Science from the University of Sydney. Her thesis was titled "The regulation of the fundraising process in Australia: searching for an optimal mix between legislative prescriptions and market forces".

Career
Albrechtsen moved to Sydney to work as a commercial solicitor at Freehills. and taught at the University of Sydney Law School. Since turning to commentary, Albrechtsen has written for The Australian Financial Review, The Age, The Sydney Morning Herald, Quadrant, Canada's National Post, the Vancouver Sun, The Wall Street Journal and The Wall Street Journal Asia.

Albrechtsen was a member of the Foreign Affairs Council from 2003 until 2007.

Albrechtsen was appointed to the board of the Australian Broadcasting Corporation in 2005. She had previously derided the ABC as a "Soviet-style workers collective". She told reporters in late 2009 that she was planning to retire from the board, and completed her five-year term on 18 February 2010 without seeking reappointment. In 2014 it was reported that Albrechtsen was appointed to an independent nomination panel that advises the Minister for Communications on the shortlisting of candidates for appointment to the ABC Board.

In 2008, Albrechtsen wrote a chapter for Peter van Onselen's book The Liberals and Power. She argued the Liberals have become preoccupied with "dominating the rational low ground", abandoning the high moral ground to the left. Norman Abjorensen said he appreciated her view of Howard's legacy as not just a transformation of the Australian economy but also one of the Labor Party.

Albrechtsen conducted a lengthy interview series in 2014 with former Prime Minister of Australia John Howard, which aired as a featured story on Seven Network's Sunday Night, and again in January 2015 as its own five-part series on Sky News Australia entitled Howard Defined.

Albrechtsen was from 2014 until 2017 director and chair of the Audit, Finance and Risk Committee of the National Museum of Australia. 

Janet Albrechtsen was appointed a Director of the Institute of Public Affairs in 2016, and as Chairman in July 2018, replacing Rod Kemp, a position held until November, 2019.

 she is an Ambassador for the Australian Indigenous Education Foundation.

Commentary
Albrechtsen's political views can be described as libertarian, as expressed by the Institute of Public Affairs. These views are based around the dignity of the individual, freedom from government control and individual responsibility. She writes about the fiscal responsibility by government and the people, issues relating to political correctness, identity politics and modern day 'grievance feminism', the growing censorship on campuses, freedom of speech and the role of civil society.

Personal life
She was married to lawyer John O'Sullivan, a friend of Malcolm Turnbull. They are now separated. The couple had three children, including Sascha O'Sullivan, who was also a journalist for The Australian.

References

External links
Janet Albrechtsen, archive of Albrechtsen's articles at The Australian

1966 births
Living people
Australian columnists
Australian people of Danish descent
Australian women journalists
Journalists from South Australia
Sydney Law School alumni
Adelaide Law School alumni
The Australian journalists
Australian women columnists
Writers from Adelaide